Alexander Xian Lim (born July 12, 1989) is a Filipino actor, model, singer, host, blogger, filmmaker and professional basketball player.

He is best known for his roles in My Binondo Girl (2011), The Reunion (2012), Ina, Kapatid, Anak (2012–13), Bakit Hindi Ka Crush ng Crush Mo? (2013), Bride for Rent (2014), The Story of Us (2016) and Everything About Her (2016).

Lim was a contract artist of Star Magic from 2008 to 2017, until signing a contract with Viva Artists Agency in January 2018 and he officially moved to GMA Network in 2022. Since 2012, Lim has notably hosted for many major televised events, particularly Binibining Pilipinas (Miss Philippines) annually, as well as Miss Grand International in Vietnam in 2017.

Early life
Born in San Francisco, California, Lim and his family moved back to Manila, Philippines six months after his birth. Following his parents' separation, he (age 10) and his mother relocated to Daly City, California. Raised by his mother, a former model turned piano teacher, resulted in Lim learning various musical instruments including piano, trombone, saxophone and guitar. He later joined a symphonic band before graduating high school at age 18. He briefly studied psychology at Skyline College in San Bruno, California, until moving to the Philippines to attend college as a basketball varsity scholar at the University of the East in Manila.

Before attaining a degree, he became involved with modeling, and eventually, acting.

Career
Lim was cast in a few minor roles before landing a supporting role in Katorse in 2009.

In 2010, he was part of the cast in the drama Rubi as Luis Navarro. Then, he guest starred in 100 Days to Heaven as Jojo Villanueva. He was a guest judge on Showtime and had one-episode appearances for Midnight DJ, Maalaala Mo Kaya, Wansapanataym and Your Song Presents: Andi.

In 2011, after a special participation in Minsan Lang Kita Iibigin portraying the young Joaquin del Tierro, he landed his first major lead role in My Binondo Girl top-billed by Kim Chiu. The romantic-comedy television drama was a nationwide success, garnering an average household TV rating of 28.2% provided by Kantar Media/TNS.

In early 2012, Lim signed a three-picture contract with Star Cinema and appeared in the film, My Cactus Heart. In the same year, he starred in a youth-oriented movie with Enchong Dee, Enrique Gil and Kean Cipriano, entitled The Reunion. He was also back in primetime through the teleserye drama Ina, Kapatid, Anak with Kim Chiu, Maja Salvador and Enchong Dee. He also released his debut studio album So It's You under Star Records which reached a Gold Record status.

In 2013, his film Bakit Hindi Ka Crush Ng Crush Mo? with his onscreen and offscreen partner Kim Chiu earned Php 10.5 million in the first day of film showing alone, consequentially surpassing the P100 million mark at the box office for the year 2013 in three weeks time. From the outstanding box office sales, the pair obtained the nickname as the newest blockbuster royalties of their generation.

In 2014, his second movie with Kim Chiu entitled Bride for Rent earned a whopping Php 21.2M on its first day and Php 100M in just 4 days. The movie eventually grossed Php 326,958,423 during its whole run in theaters which validated the KimXi tandem's box office draw.

From 2015 to 2017, he has starred in a succession of roles, starting with his voice over for the Filipino release of Paddington, as well as leading and supporting film credits in All You Need Is Pag-ibig (2015), Everything About Her (2016) and Sin Island (2018).

After Lim signed a contract with Viva Artists Agency months after his contract with Star Magic expired in mid-2017, he confirmed his directorial debut in his film Tabon, which premiered at the Cinemalaya 2019. He transferred to GMA Network after seen in Maynila episodes in 2010.

As of 2022, Kapuso actor Xian Lim made his directorial debut in GMA Network's movie Wish Ko Lang. Xian shared the exciting news with his followers on Instagram on Tuesday, August 23, 2022, as he shared some of the behind-the-scenes snaps from a shoot. His recent career is now managed by Viva Artist Agency (talent agency) since 2017 and has a television network contract with GMA (network) since April 2020.

Personal life
Lim actively promotes living a healthy lifestyle and his interests include filmmaking, traveling and sports. He is a self-professed health-buff, enjoys activities like running and exercises, with further intentions to someday joining a triathlon.

In 2011, Xian began courting fellow Star Magic artist and leading lady Kim Chiu. Lim and Chiu began dating in 2012, which was confirmed in a 2013 episode of Kris TV.

On November 15, 2018, Kim Chiu confirmed her relationship with Lim in an interview on Tonight with Boy Abunda.

Activism
Lim has participated in various charity games including annual birthday events at local missions foundations, performing at benefit concerts, an event in Iloilo under Star Magic and San Juan City for the victims of Typhoon Sendong. In August 2012, he and Kim Chiu spearheaded a relief operation in Marikina for the city's flood-affected victims.

During 2013, Lim joined the PETA Free Mali campaign along with Kim Chiu. Lim made a video plea for Mali asking that she be moved to a sanctuary for the sake of her well-being.

Basketball career
Lim played for the Mandaluyong El Tigre for the 2018–2019 season of MPBL.

Filmography

Film

Television

Digital

Discography

Studio albums

Singles

Concerts

Awards, nominations and recognitions

Notes

References

External links

1989 births
Living people
People from Antipolo
Filipino male child actors
Filipino male television actors
Filipino male models
21st-century Filipino male singers
Bicolano actors
Bicolano people
Viva Artists Agency
Star Magic
Star Music artists
ABS-CBN personalities
GMA Network personalities
GMA Network (company) people
University of the East alumni
Filipino men's basketball players
Television personalities from San Francisco
Maharlika Pilipinas Basketball League players
Basketball players from San Francisco
UE Red Warriors basketball players
Filipino male film actors
Filipino people of Chinese descent
Citizens of the Philippines through descent